"My Girl"  is a soul music song recorded by the Temptations for the Gordy (Motown) record label. Written and produced by the Miracles members Smokey Robinson and Ronald White, it became the Temptations' first U.S. number 1 single, and is currently their signature song. Robinson's inspiration for writing "My Girl" was his wife, Miracles member Claudette Rogers Robinson.  The song was included on the Temptations 1965 album The Temptations Sing Smokey. In 2017, the song was selected for preservation in the National Recording Registry by the Library of Congress as being "culturally, historically, or artistically significant".

Recording and release 
The recorded version of "My Girl" was the first Temptations single to feature David Ruffin on lead vocals. Previously, Eddie Kendricks and Paul Williams had performed most of the group's lead vocals, and Ruffin had joined the group as a replacement for former Temptation Elbridge Bryant. While on tour as part of the Motortown Revue, a collective tour for most of the Motown roster, Smokey Robinson caught the Temptations' part of the show. For their set, the group had included a medley of soul standards, one of which, the Drifters' "Under the Boardwalk", was a solo spot for Ruffin. Impressed, Robinson decided to produce a single with Ruffin singing lead. Robinson saw Ruffin as a "sleeping giant" in the group with a unique voice that was "mellow" yet "gruff". Robinson thought that if he could write just the perfect song for Ruffin's voice, then he could have a smash hit. The composition was to be something that Ruffin could "belt out" yet something that was also "melodic and sweet".

After some persuasion from Ruffin's bandmates, Robinson had the Temptations record "My Girl" instead of the Miracles, who were originally going to record the song, and recruited Ruffin to sing the lead vocals. According to Robinson, he allowed the group to create their own background vocals "because they were so great at background vocals".  Consequently, the Temptations came up with boosts like "hey hey hey" and a series of "my girls" that echo David's vocal." The opening bass notes are recognized around the world. As Smokey Robinson says, "I can be in a foreign country where people don't speak English and the audience will start cheering before I even start singing "My Girl." They know what's coming as soon as they hear the opening bass line. [He sings the famous line created by bassist James Jamerson:] 'Bah bum-bum, bah bum-bum, bah bum-bum.'" The signature guitar riff heard during the introduction and under the verses was played by Robert White of the Funk Brothers. This part can be heard without vocals on the 2004 deluxe edition of the soundtrack from the 2002 documentary Standing in the Shadows of Motown.

"My Girl" was later sampled for "Stay", a single from the Temptations' 1998 album Phoenix Rising.  The single was re-released in 1992, following the November 1991 release of the film of the same name, which featured the song. It did not reach the Billboard charts, but did reach number 2 in the UK Singles Chart.

Reception 
"My Girl" climbed to the top of the U.S. pop charts on January 16, 1965, after its Christmas time 1964 release, making it the Temptations' first number 1 hit. The single was also the first number 1 hit on the reinstated Billboard R&B Singles chart, which had gone on a fifteen-month hiatus from 1963 to 1965. The single also gave the Gordy label its first number 1 on the Hot 100.

Over time, "My Girl", with its signature introduction and unrestrained expression of joy, would become one of Motown's best-known and most successful singles. "My Girl" was inducted into the Grammy Hall of Fame in 1998.

Cash Box described the single as "a pulsating, shuffle-wobble ballad" performed "in very tempting style" and with  a "striking arrangement."  In 2004, "My Girl" was ranked number 88 on Rolling Stones list of "The 500 Greatest Songs of All Time".

Personnel 
 David Ruffin – lead vocals
 Eddie Kendricks – backing vocals
 Melvin Franklin – backing vocals
 Paul Williams – backing vocals
 Otis Williams – backing vocals
 The Funk Brothers and the Detroit Symphony Orchestra – instrumentation 
 Robert White – guitar
 Earl Van Dyke – piano
 James Jamerson – bass
 Benny Benjamin – drums
 Paul Riser – horn and string arrangements

Charts

Weekly charts

Year-end charts

Certifications

Otis Redding version 

In 1965, Otis Redding recorded the song for his album Otis Blue. Released as a single, it was the first version to be successful in the United Kingdom, reaching No.11 in the UK Singles Chart.

See also 
List of Billboard Hot 100 number-one singles of 1965
List of number-one R&B singles of 1965 (U.S.)

References

External links
 

1964 singles
1965 singles
1992 singles
The Temptations songs
Motown singles
Otis Redding songs
Atco Records singles
Billboard Hot 100 number-one singles
Songs written by Smokey Robinson
Songs written by Ronald White
Song recordings produced by Smokey Robinson
Gordy Records singles
1964 songs
United States National Recording Registry recordings
1960s ballads